Vladimir Bogdanov is a music critic, author, AllMusic editor and record producer. He is the editor of the fourth edition of the All Music Guide to Jazz (2002), and president of the AllMusic guide series.  Bogdanov created the first database for what was then the All Media Group.

References

American music critics
living people
year of birth missing (living people)